Hoshihananomia transsylvanica is a species of beetle in the genus Hoshihananomia of the family Mordellidae, which is part of the superfamily Tenebrionoidea. It was discovered in 1977.

References

Beetles described in 1977
Mordellidae
Endemic fauna of Romania